Oliver Joakim Larsen (born 25 December 1998) is a Danish professional ice hockey defenceman currently playing for Mikkelin Jukurit in the Liiga and the Danish national team.

He represented Denmark at the 2019 IIHF World Championship.

Career statistics

Regular season and playoffs

International

References

External links

1998 births
Living people
IF Björklöven players
Danish expatriate ice hockey people
Danish expatriate sportspeople in Sweden
Danish ice hockey defencemen
Leksands IF players
Mikkelin Jukurit players
Odense Bulldogs players
IK Oskarshamn players
IK Pantern players
Sportspeople from Aalborg
Ice hockey players at the 2022 Winter Olympics
Olympic ice hockey players of Denmark